Małgorzata Śmieszek (born 11 July 1996) is a Polish volleyball player. She plays for KC Pałac Bydgoszcz in the Orlen Liga.

Śmieszek was part of the winning Polish team at the 2013 Girls' Youth European Volleyball Championship.

References

Living people
1996 births
Polish women's volleyball players
People from Skierniewice